Calescharidae is a family of bryozoans belonging to the order Cheilostomatida.

Genera:
 Caleschara MacGillivray, 1880
 Hagenowinella Canu, 1900
 Tretosina Canu & Bassler, 1927

References

Cheilostomatida